During the 1991–92 English football season, Oldham Athletic A.F.C. competed in the Football League First Division, where they had last played in 1923. A 17th-place finish in the final table was enough for survival and a place in the new FA Premier League for the 1992–93 season.

Season summary
Oldham enjoyed a comfortable return to the top flight after 68 years and finished in 17th, nine points clear of relegation. Although the club only won away three times during the season, strong home form – Oldham only lost five times at home and notably took the scalps of eventual champions Leeds United and eventual third-placed Sheffield Wednesday – proved pivotal in keeping Oldham up.

The season was the first at Boundary Park for striker Graeme Sharp, who joined the club after a long and successful spell at Everton and finished as one of the division's top scorers with 16 goals. Following Sharp to Oldham was midfielder Mike Milligan, who had transferred in the opposite direction a year earlier.

Final league table

Results
Oldham Athletic's score comes first

Legend

Football League First Division

FA Cup

League Cup

Full Members Cup

Squad

Transfers

In

Out

Transfers in:  £1,730,000
Transfers out:  £2,700,000
Total spending:  £970,000

References

Oldham Athletic A.F.C. seasons
Oldham Athletic